Best of Decade I: 1995–2005 is a compilation album, featuring singles released on Rawkus Records during their first ten years. The compilation revolves around the label's star Mos Def, who appears on eight of the fifteen tracks. There is one previously unreleased track featured on the album, which is the Mos Def song "Beef".

The album features one track from the Soundbombing compilation, one track from the Lyricist Lounge, Volume One compilation, two tracks from the Soundbombing 2 compilation, one track from the Lyricist Lounge 2 compilation, one track from the Soundbombing III compilation, two tracks from Mos Def & Talib Kweli's Black Star album, two tracks from Mos Def's Black on Both Sides album, one track from Big L's The Big Picture album, one track from Reflection Eternal's Train of Thought album, one track from Hi-Tek's Hi-Teknology album, and one track from Talib Kweli's Quality album.

Track listing

Singles Chart Positions

2005 greatest hits albums
Rawkus Records compilation albums
Record label compilation albums